Torey James DeFalco (born April 10, 1997) is an American professional volleyball player. He is a member of the US national team, and a participant in the Olympic Games Tokyo 2020. At the professional club level, he plays for Asseco Resovia.

Career

College
DeFalco played four years of college volleyball at California State University, Long Beach. While at LBSU, he reached the NCAA Final Four all four years (2016–2019) and won the NCAA Championship twice (2018, 2019). He was a two–time AVCA Player of the Year (2017, 2019), the AVCA Newcomer of the Year (2016), and a four–time AVCA First Team All American (2016–2019). He was named Most Outstanding Player of the 2019 NCAA Championships, as well as being named to the NCAA All–Tournament Team three times (2016, 2018, 2019). DeFalco majored in Consumer Affairs.

Clubs
In June 2019, DeFalco signed his first professional volleyball contract with the Italian team, Tonno Callipo Calabria Vibo Valentia. For the 2021–22 season, he joined Indykpol AZS Olsztyn. For the 2022-2023 season, he is playing for Polish club, Asseco Resovia.

Honours

College
 National championships
 2018  NCAA National Championship, with Long Beach State Beach
 2019  NCAA National Championship, with Long Beach State Beach

Youth national team
 2014  NORCECA U19 Championship

Individual awards
 2014: NORCECA U19 Championship – Most Valuable Player
 2014: NORCECA U19 Championship – Best Outside Hitter
 2016: AVCA First-Team All-American
 2016: NCAA National Championship – All Tournament Team
 2017: AVCA First-Team All-American
 2017: AVCA National Player of the Year
 2018: AVCA First-Team All-American
 2018: All-Big West First-Team (Player of the Year)
 2018: NCAA National Championship – All Tournament Team
 2019: AVCA First-Team All-American
 2019: AVCA National Player of the Year
 2019: All-Big West First-Team
 2019: NCAA National Championship – All Tournament Team (Most Outstanding Player)
 2019: NORCECA Championship – Best Outside Spiker
 2022: Polish Championship – Best Scorer (536)

References

External links

 Player profile at TeamUSA.org 
 Player profile at LegaVolley.it 
 Player profile at PlusLiga.pl 
 
 
 Player profile at Volleybox.net

1997 births
Living people
Sportspeople from Huntington Beach, California
California State University, Long Beach alumni
American men's volleyball players
Olympic volleyball players of the United States
Volleyball players at the 2020 Summer Olympics
Beach volleyball players at the 2014 Summer Youth Olympics
American expatriate sportspeople in Italy
Expatriate volleyball players in Italy
American expatriate sportspeople in Poland
Expatriate volleyball players in Poland
Long Beach State Beach men's volleyball players
AZS Olsztyn players
Resovia (volleyball) players
Outside hitters